This was the first edition of the tournament.

Angela Kulikov and Rianna Valdes won the title, defeating Elizabeth Halbauer and Ingrid Neel in the final, 7–6(7–3), 4–6, [17–15].

Seeds

Draw

Draw

References

External Links
Main Draw

Thoreau Tennis Open - Doubles
Tennis in Massachusetts